1-Androstenedione, or 5α-androst-1-ene-3,17-dione, also known as 4,5α-dihydro-δ1-4-androstenedione, is a synthetic androgen and anabolic steroid. It is a 5α-reduced isomer of the endogenous steroid 4-androstenedione and acts as an androgen prohormone of 1-testosterone (4,5α-dihydro-δ1-testosterone), a derivative of dihydrotestosterone (DHT).

1-Androstenedione is on the World Anti-Doping Agency's list of prohibited substances, and is therefore banned from use in most major sports.

See also
 1-Androstenediol

References

Androgens and anabolic steroids
Androstanes
Prodrugs
World Anti-Doping Agency prohibited substances